Concord-Padgett Regional Airport  is a city-owned, public-use airport located seven nautical miles (13 km) west of the central business district of Concord, a city in Cabarrus County, North Carolina, United States.  According to the FAA's National Plan of Integrated Airport Systems for 2009–2013, it is classified as a reliever airport for Charlotte Douglas International Airport.

Although many U.S. airports use the same three-letter location identifier for the FAA and IATA, this airport is assigned JQF by the FAA but had no designation from the IATA until August 22, 2013 when it was assigned the IATA code USA.

Because of the multiple race teams that base aircraft fleets at JQF and its proximity to Charlotte Motor Speedway, the airport is sometimes referred to as "NASCAR's Airport."

In April 2018, the airport was renamed to honor longtime Mayor of Concord Scott Padgett. An official ceremony was held on November 18, 2019, for the airport's 25th anniversary.

Facilities and aircraft
It has one runway designated 2/20 with an asphalt surface measuring 7,400 by 100 feet (2,256 x 30 m).

For the 12-month period ending June 30, 2019, the airport had 77,871 aircraft operations, an average of 213 per day: 87% general aviation, 8% air taxi, 1% military and 4% scheduled commercial. At that time there were 166 aircraft based at this airport: 69% single-engine, 9% multi-engine, 19% jet and 3% helicopter.

NASCAR
Since the airport's expansion of its runway to accommodate mid-size commercial aircraft in the early 2000s, the airport has been quite popular among local NASCAR teams. Teams charter flights out of Concord-Padgett instead of Charlotte Douglas because of its affordability and proximity to their headquarters.

Commercial passenger service
On August 20, 2013, Allegiant Air announced it would begin nonstop jet service between Concord and Orlando Sanford International Airport in December 2013. Since then the airline has expanded its nonstop service to several other vacation destinations in Florida as well as announcing new nonstop service to New Orleans. An existing hangar to the left of the main terminal was converted to a separate temporary terminal for this new commercial service. A larger permanent commercial service terminal opened in October 2016.  According to FlightAware, Allegiant serves the airport with Airbus A320 jetliners. On March 4, 2020, Allegiant announced Concord would be the airline's 21st operating base, housing two Airbus planes beginning October 7, 2020.

Airline and destinations

Statistics

Top destinations

References

External links

Concord-Padgett Regional Airport, official site
 at North Carolina DOT airport guide
Aerial photo as of March 1998 from USGS The National Map

Airports in North Carolina
Transportation in Cabarrus County, North Carolina
Buildings and structures in Cabarrus County, North Carolina